World Series Cricket (WSC) was a professional cricket competition established by Kerry Packer which ran from 1977 and 1979. Packer set the competition up after failing to gain the rights to show Test cricket on his Channel Nine television channel. It was opposed by the International Cricket Conference (ICC), who ruled that such matches would not be first-class, and any players taking part would be banned from playing in officially sanctioned cricket, although the latter was ruled to be a "restraint of trade" and was not enforceable. They also barred the WSC from using the term "Test matches", or naming a team "Australia". As a result, the matches were dubbed "Supertests", while the teams were WSC Australia XI, WSC West Indies XI and WSC World XI. In all, 16 Supertests and 58 international one-day matches were played, before Packer and the Australian Cricket Board came to an agreement in May 1979, and World Series Cricket came to an end.

The first Supertest began on 2 December 1977, although the first century (100 or more runs in a single innings) was not scored until the third match, in which Ian Chappell accumulated 141 runs in the first innings. Bruce Laird and Viv Richards went on to score centuries in the same match. A month later, Barry Richards achieved the competition's first double century, scoring 207 runs for the WSC World XI. In the same innings, Gordon Greenidge and Richards also passed a hundred, while Greg Chappell did so in the second innings for WSC Australia XI. In the next match, Greg Chappell surpassed Richards' total, remaining 246 not out, one of his record five WSC centuries.

Only two centuries were made in the international one-day matches. Kepler Wessels scored the first, accruing 136 runs; his score is the highest in WSC one-day international matches, and makes him the only player to have scored a century in both a Supertest and an international one-day match in the WSC. The other century was scored by Martin Kent, who scored 109 runs. In all, 25 centuries were scored in Supertests, and 2 in international one-day matches. Seven of the centuries were scored at VFL Park in Melbourne, the most of any venue.

Key

Century scores

See also

 List of World Series Cricket international five-wicket hauls

Notes and references
Notes

References

Centuries
World Series Cricket